Oakley Cannonier (born 6 May 2004) is an English professional footballer who plays for Liverpool Under-21s.

Early life 
Cannonier was born in Leeds, Yorkshire. Despite early trials with Manchester City, he joined local side Leeds United as an under-9.

A Liverpool supporter from an early age, as he was a fan of Fernando Torres, he joined the Liverpool academy in Kirkby, aged 11, where he soon started playing above his age group.

Club career

Headlines as a ball boy 
Cannonier first made headlines on 7 May 2019, following his performance as one of the ball boys for Liverpool's 4–0 win over Barcelona in the Champions League semi-final. Liverpool manager Jürgen Klopp had noticed that the Spanish team was often slow at getting in position for set-pieces, so the ball boys from The Academy were instructed to return balls to Liverpool's players as quickly as possible. With 11 minutes to go, Cannonier gave Trent Alexander-Arnold the ball, allowing him to take a quick corner, passing to Divock Origi for the decisive fourth goal, completing one of the most memorable victories in the history of the club. Liverpool went on to beat Tottenham Hotspur in the final.

A top scorer with the youth teams 
Cannonier started playing in the U18 Premier League in 2020, already scoring his first goal in November that year, in a league game against its former team, Leeds United; however, he saw his season prematurely ended because of a hamstring injury, ruling him out of that year's FA Youth Cup final. He signed his first professional contract for Liverpool in the off-season.

The following season, Cannonier proved to be a prolific goalscorer for Marc Bridge-Wilkinson's Under-18s side, as he netted his first hat-trick against Manchester United in August 2021. On 9 April 2022, he scored four goals for the youth team, as they beat his former Leeds team 10–3. By the end of the season, he had also trained with Jürgen Klopp's first-team squad.

Cannonier scored a total of 34 goals in all competitions, including 28 in the U18 Premier League, making him the competition's top scorer as Liverpool finished second in the North group, just behind league winners Manchester City. Having also played a key role in the knock-out stage of the Youth League and made his EFL Trophy debut, the striker ended the season with a new long-term contract in Liverpool.

Early in the 2022–23 season, Cannonier scored the winner against Napoli and a hat-trick against Ajax in the UEFA Youth League, as well as registering a brace against Wolverhampton Wanderers for the Under-23s in Premier League 2.

International career 
Cannonier is a youth international for England since 2019, as he discovered the under-16s that summer.

After the covid-forced youth competition break, Cannonier was capped for the England under-18s in March 2022, scoring on his debut against Sweden. Later that year, he was called up to the England under-19s, scoring a brace on his first start for the team, a 6–0 victory over Georgia in qualifying for the 2023 European Under-19 Championships.

Style of play 
An ambidextrous footballer, Cannonier mainly plays as a centre-forward, where he proved to be a prolific goalscorer for Liverpool's youth teams. Despite then being below the height standards for this position, he stood out with his skills, movement, determination and positional awareness in front of the goal, allowing him to be regularly decisive. During his first years in the academy, he played more as a number 10, but evolved as a striker while keeping his ability to provide assists.

References

External links

Profile at liverpoolfc.com

2004 births
Living people
English footballers
England youth international footballers
Association football forwards
Footballers from Leeds
Liverpool F.C. players
Leeds United F.C. players